The 1937 Coupe de France Final was a football match held at Stade Olympique Yves-du-Manoir, Colombes on May 9, 1937, that saw FC Sochaux-Montbéliard defeat RC Strasbourg 2–1 thanks to goals by Miguel Angel Lauri and Bernard Williams.

Match details

See also
Coupe de France 1936-1937

External links
Coupe de France results at Rec.Sport.Soccer Statistics Foundation
Report on French federation site

Coupe
1937
Coupe De France Final 1937
Coupe De France Final 1937
Sport in Hauts-de-Seine
Coupe de France Final
Coupe de France Final